Franz Ferdinand Richter (c.1693, Ebersdorf, near Breslau - after 1737, Florence) was a German Baroque painter who worked in Italy .

Life and work 
Information on his early life is almost totally lacking. He was first documented on 18 May 1727, when he was in Rome; applying for a passport to return home. It is certain that he was a long time resident of Florence; and that he died there.

Works known to be his include a portrait of the violinist and composer, Francesco Maria Veracini, which is better known as an engraving by the English artist, John June. There is also record of a portrait of the poet and playwright, Giovan Battista Fagiuoli, from 1736, whose current location is unknown. His self-portrait (c.1720/25) is in the Uffizi Gallery.

In the Galleria Palatina at the Palazzo Pitti, there is a monumental portrait of Gian Gastone de' Medici, wearing his Grand Ducal paraphernalia, in rococo style; one of his last dated works from 1737.

References

Further reading 
 Witt library, A checklist of painters, c1200-1976: represented in the Witt library, Courtland institute of art, London, 1978, Mansell

External links

1690s births
1730s deaths
18th-century German painters
18th-century German male artists
German emigrants to Italy